The 2004 NCAA Division I women's volleyball tournament began on December 2, 2004 with 64 teams and ended December 18 when Stanford defeated Minnesota 3 games to 0 in Long Beach, California for the program's sixth NCAA title.

Stanford, who was the tournament's 11th overall seed, became the lowest seed to win the national title. Minnesota was making the school's first national championship match appearance. Stanford's sixth NCAA national championship was the most of any other program in Division I, although UCLA and Southern California had each won six overall national collegiate titles up to that point.

Ogonna Nnamani, the tournament's Most Outstanding Player, set an NCAA tournament record for kills in a tournament, as she had 165 in six matches, including 29 against Minnesota in the final. Nnamani also set the NCAA tournament record for kill attempts at 356. Stanford setter Bryn Kehoe became the first freshman setter to lead a team to an NCAA national championship.

Records

Louisville Regional

Minneapolis Regional

Green Bay Regional

Seattle Regional

Final Four – Long Beach Arena, Long Beach, California

National Semifinals

Southern California vs. Minnesota

Behind 18 kills from Minnesota's Erin Martin, the Golden Gophers knocked out two-time defending NCAA Champion USC with a 3-1 decision to advance to their first NCAA Championship match in school history.

Stanford vs. Washington

Stanford, the surprise of the tournament, came through with a 3-1 win over Pac-10 champion Washington. Ogonna Nnamani had 33 kills to lead Stanford to the championship match. During the regular season, Stanford and Washington split the match ups, with Washington sweeping the Cardinal in Seattle and Stanford returning the favor in Palo Alto by defeating the Huskies in five.

National Championship: Stanford vs. Minnesota

Behind 29 kills from Nnamani, Stanford completed their NCAA run by sweeping the Golden Gophers. Stanford easily won the first set, 30-23. The second was much closer, with Stanford going on a late run to win the second set, 30-27.

The third set was not competitive, which may have been due to an injury. Early in the third set, Minnesota's All-American libero, Paula Gentil, collided with a teammate while trying to dig a ball which left her unable to move on the court for over five minutes. Gentil was able to get up, but could not return to the match with a neck injury. Stanford won easily, 30-21.

Stanford's surprising run was due to the fact that they started out the season 15-6 and were ranked outside of the top ten in the beginning of the season. However, the Cardinal found momentum in the middle of the season, winning their last 15 matches including an upset of then-#1 and undefeated Washington in five sets.

NCAA Tournament records

There are four NCAA tournament records that were set in the 2004 tournament.

Kills, tournament (individual record) -  Ogonna Nnamani, Stanford University - 165 total kills (18 vs. Jacksonville, 30 vs. Florida, 28 vs. Texas, 27 vs. Wisconsin, 33 vs. Washington, 29 vs. Minnesota).
Total attempts, tournament (individual record) - Ogonna Nnamani, Stanford University - 356 total attempts (36 vs. Jacksonville, 89 vs. Florida, 56 vs. Texas, 49 vs. Wisconsin, 78 vs. Washington, 48 vs. Minnesota).
Solo blocks, tournament (individual record) - Ogonna Nnamani, Stanford University - 15 solo blocks (2 vs. Jacksonville, 3 vs. Florida, 2 vs. Texas, 2 vs. Wisconsin, 5 vs. Washington, 1 vs. Minnesota).
Total digs, tournament (individual record) - Paula Gentil, University of Minnesota - 173 total digs (25 vs. Long Island, 21 vs. Yale, 38 vs. Ohio State, 41 vs. Georgia Tech, 33 vs. Southern California, 15 vs. Stanford).

References

NCAA Women's Volleyball Championship
NCAA
Sports in Long Beach, California
NCAA Division I women's volleyball tournament
Volleyball in California
December 2004 sports events in the United States
Sports competitions in California
Women's sports in California
College sports tournaments in California